Nina Sky is the debut studio album by Puerto Rican-American girl group Nina Sky. The album was released on June 22, 2004, in the United States and a week later worldwide. It debuted at number 44 on the US Billboard 200 and sold 341,000 copies according to Nielsen Soundscan. The lead single "Move Ya Body" received a Gold Certification from Recording Industry Association of America (RIAA). The second single was "Turnin' Me On", but did not match the success of "Move Ya Body".

The single "Move Ya Body" was released on April 12, 2004, and reached number 17 on the Billboard Hot 100 chart. Urban music and rhythmic top 40 stations quickly added the song to their playlists, sending the song up the charts. By July 17, "Move Ya Body" had gone to the top five on both sides of the Atlantic and had also reached the top five of a world combined R&B chart based on the United States, United Kingdom, Germany, France and Australia. The song had also reached the top fifty of the Australian charts. "Turnin' Me On" was released in November 2004, but without the success of "Move Ya Body". It was a minor hit in France and United States, peaking at number five on US Billboard'''s Bubbling Under Hot 100 chart. The twins continued to work and promote their music. They have contributed to the reggaeton movement with songs such as "Oye Mi Canto", and "Más Maíz" with artist and producer N.O.R.E. They were also featured artists on Sean Paul's song "Connection" from his album The Trinity.

Background and recording
In March 2004, Nicole and Natalie held their first live performance as Nina Sky. Concert was held in Club Demara on 18 March, which they revealed eleven years later. Later that year, record producer The Jettsonz introduced the girls to Cipha Sounds, a hip hop DJ under the Star Trak label owned by The Neptunes (Pharrell and Chad Hugo). Cipha Sounds was impressed when he heard the girls sing and suggested that they use the "Coolie Dance" riddim. The twins then proceeded to write "Move Ya Body" (along with The Jettsonz, who also produced the record), mixing Caribbean rhythms. Eventually, a demo of the song was made. The demo fell into the hands of Eddie O'Loughlin, the president of Next Plateau Entertainment (which is a division of Universal Records). O'Loughlin signed the twins to a contract and they started working on their debut album.Nina Sky on Shazam  Twins recorded the album between 2003 and early 2004, mostly in The Hit Factory studio located in New York City. Many producers and musicians worked with them on the record, including The Jettsonz, Cipha Sounds, Supa Dups, Disco D, Betty Wright, E.J. Wells etc. Songs "Move Ya Body" and "In a Dream" were both released two months before the full album was released, and were included on Move Ya Body EP.

Release and promotionNina Sky was released on June 22, 2004, in the United States and on June 29, 2004, in other countries. It was promoted with two singles: "Move Ya Body" and "Turnin' Me On".
 The album's first single was Move Ya Body. It was released on April 12, 2004. Music video was released in April. The song charted at number 4 on the Billboard Hot 100 and number 22 on the 2004 Billboard Year-End Chart. It also reached number 6 on the UK Singles Chart. It was certified Gold by the RIAA in early 2005. Its B-side is a song "In a Dream". Nina Sky were often regarded as one-hit wonders, since "Move Ya Body" was the duo's only single to reach top 40 on Billboard Hot 100. The song ranked at number 250 on Blender's 500 Greatest Songs Since You Were Born.
 The album's second and final single was "Turnin' Me On". It was released on November 30, 2004, for digital download. The single did not make the same success like previous single "Move Ya Body", but it reached number 5 on Bubbling Under Hot 100. There were three remixes released for the song: One remix features Cham, the second remix features Pitbull and Shawnna and the third remix is Kassanova Remix, which was used for their second mixtape album La Conexion.

Album was also promoted with a mixtape, featuring remixes and collaborations. Mixtape was released later in 2004. It features a remix by Vybz Kartel for "Move Ya Body".

Critical reception

Album received mixed reviews from music critics. Entertainment Weekly gave the album B while Stylus Magazine gave C. Rolling Stone and Slant Magazine both gave album three out of five stars. AllMusic gave 3.5 stars while People Magazine gave two out of five stars.

Commercial performanceNina Sky was moderate success in United States. However, it wasn't successful outside the United States, peaking at number 135 on UK Albums Chart and not peaking on any other chart except for charts in the US. It peaked at number forty-four on US Billboard 200 and number four on Top R&B/Hip-Hop Albums. It sold around 500,000 copies, being certified Gold by Recording Industry Association of America.

The album's first single "Move Ya Body" performed excellently worldwide, peaking at number four on the Billboard Hot 100, but album did not perform that well, only peaking in United States and United Kingdom. Second single "Turnin' Me On" was not as successful: it failed to enter the Billboard'' Hot 100 and peaked at number five on Bubbling Under Hot 100. It was also a minor hit in France.

A mixtape which promoted the album was also released later in 2004. There was song "Oye Mi Canto" and also remixes of "Move Ya Body", "Turnin' Me On" and "Holla Back". A collaboration with Angie Martinez titled "Time to Go" was also included. Mixtape failed to chart anywhere and is extremely rare.

Title
The album was self-titled. The sisters wanted to devise a name of their own. In using the first two syllables of their names ("Ni" and "Na"), they came up with Nina. They then added Sky, which for them represented "the sky's the limit".

Artwork
Album's artwork was made sometime in 2004. The picture was taken by John Ricard and features twins (Nicole left, Natalie right) in front of white wall painted in green and black. Nicole wore green blouse with records painted on it and dark blue round earrings. Natalie wore long green earrings and dark brown top. Hair stylist Q, make-up artist Mylah Morales and fashion stylist Malaika Elcock helped twins to get ready (according to Discogs). This was Nina Sky's second album cover to feature their first logotype (the first was the cover for single/EP "Move Ya Body").

Track listing

Sample credits 
 "Move Ya Body" contains a portion of "Can You Feel the Beat" by Lisa Lisa and Cult Jam featuring Full Force.
 "Your Time" contains a sample from embodies portions of "Let Me Down Easy" performed by Inez Foxx.
 "Runaway" embodies portions of "Walking into Sunshine" by Central Line.
 "Surely Missed" embodies portions of "Something" performed by Al Green.

Charts

Release history

References

External links 
 

Nina Sky albums
2004 debut albums
Albums produced by Supa Dups